The following are the association football events of the year 1896 throughout the world.

Events
March 16 - England defeat Wales  9-1 at Cardiff

Clubs founded in 1896
Basingstoke Town F.C.
Bracknell Town F.C.
CS Constantine
Ciclista Lima
Club Atlético Banfield
Crawley Town F.C.
Hannover 96
FC Heilbronn
FC Schaffhausen (June)
FC Winterthur
FC Zürich (August)
Horwich RMI F.C.
Olympia Leipzig
Skill F.C. de Bruxelles
Udinese Calcio
Viborg FF
Willem II Tilburg

Clubs dissolved in 1896
Royal Ordnance Factories

National champions
Argentina: Lomas Academy
Belgium: FC Liégeois (first Coupe de Championnat winners)
England: Aston Villa
France: Club Français Paris
Ireland: Distillery
Scotland: Scottish Cup, Hearts
Sweden: Örgryte IS (first Svenska Mästerskapet winners)

International tournaments
1896 British Home Championship (February 29 – April 4, 1896)

Births
 August 28 – Harry Dénis, Dutch footballer (d. 1971)
 September 27 – Jaap Bulder, Dutch footballer (d. 1979)
 November 22 – George Reader, English football referee (d. 1978)

Deaths
 November 29 - Joe Powell, 26, Woolwich Arsenal captain, due to injuries sustained in a match.

References 

 
Association football by year